"One Night Affair" is a 1969 song by the O'Jays. It was released on the Neptune Records label. It is cited as one of the first disco songs.

Chart performance

Jerry Butler version

In 1972, Jerry Butler released a cover of the song.

Asha Puthli version
Asha Puthli recorded a cover of this song on her 1975 second solo album titled "She Loves to Hear the Music" released on the CBS
Columbia Label.

References

1969 songs
The O'Jays songs